Jelena Jovanova Perić (born 21 October 1984) is a Macedonian actress.

Biography
Jelena Jovanova was born in SR Bosnia and Herzegovina to a Macedonian father from Štip and a Bosnian Serb mother from Prijedor, was raised in Macedonia, then married and moved to Croatia.
She graduated from The Faculty of Dramatic Arts in Skopje. Member of Macedonian National Theater since 2006 where she played over twenty-five leading roles.

Career
Her powerful big screen debut was in Juanita Wilson's As If I Am Not There, which has been selected as the Irish entry for the Best Foreign Language Film at the 84th Academy Awards.

In 2010, she was cast in Angelina Jolie's directorial debut In the Land of Blood and Honey, nominated for Best Foreign Language Film at the 69th Golden Globe Awards. This film made her the first Macedonian actress ever to appear in a Hollywood production.

Filmography

 As If I Am Not There (2010)
 In the Land of Blood and Honey (2011)
 The Third Half (2012)
 Skopje Remix (2012)
 Ckopa (2015)
The Constitution (2016)
 Child (2016)
Iron Story (2017)
Hey! (2018)
The Witch Hunters (2018)
Black and White (2018)
El Desentierro (2018)
Willow (2019)
Homo (2020)

Television
 Secrets (Tajne) as Marina Franic (2013-2014)
Whichever Way the Ball Bounces as Nadalija (2015)
Prespav as Jelena (2016-2021)
In Treatment (Na terapija) as Milena (2017)
Insajder as Iskra (2017)
Pagan Peak as Ivana (2019)

Selected Stage Roles

 Chicago as Roxie Hart 
 Who's Afraid of Virginia Woolf? as Honey
 Push Up 1-3 as Sabine
 Troilus and Cressida as Helen of Troy
 Twig in the Wind as Magda
 Hasanaginica as Hasanaginica
 Sexual Perversity in Chicago as Deborah
 A Clockwork Orange as Alex
 The Decameron as Filomena
 Dundo Maroje as Petrunjela
 Don Quixote as Dulcinea
 Class Enemy as Iron
 Miss Julie as Miss Julie

References

External links

Interview for The Huffington Post

1984 births
Living people
Macedonian film actresses
Macedonian stage actresses
Macedonian television actresses
21st-century actresses
People from Banja Luka
People from Štip
Macedonian people of Serbian descent
Macedonian people of Bosnia and Herzegovina descent